Claudio Zanier (born 1942) is an Italian historian specialising in the history of East Asia and South East Asia, and in the history of silk, in particular.

Career 
Zanier  is a historian specialising in the history of East and South East Asia. He has held academic positions in Italy, and has been a visiting research at many institutions. \

He was Assistant Professor in Political Economy, at Rome University, 1968-1974; Associate Professor (Tenured), History of East and South East Asia, Dept. of Modern and Contemporary History,  University of Pisa, 1975-2012, Associate Professor (Temporary), Industrial Archeology, Corso diLaurea in Conservazione dei BeniCulturali, Università di Pisa, 1994-1998.
He had held several research fellowships: at the Gokhale Institute of Politics and Economics, Pune (India), 1967-1968; the India Office Library and Records, London, 1979-1980; and School of Oriental and African Studies, London, 1983-1984; Scientific Coordinator for Italy, Silk Cultural Itineraries, Council of Europe, Strasbourg, 1991-2000; Visiting Professor, Institute for Economic Research,  Hitotsubashi University, Tokyo, 1999-2000; Chercheur Associé, Ecole des Hautes Etudes enSciences Sociales, Centre de Recherches Historiques, Paris,  2003-2006; Founding Member: AIPAI - Associazione Italiana per l'Archeologia Industriale (Italian Association for Industrial Archaeology) 2004. Now retired from the University of Pisa, he is a visiting scholar at the China National Silk Museum, focusing on the history of silk.

Selected publications 
 1975 Accumulazione esviluppo economico in Giappone - dalla fine del XVI alla fine del secolo [Japanese Economic Development, 16th to 19th Century], Einaudi, Torino 1975."
 1980 "Japanese periodicals in Italian public libraries - a preliminary note", Bulletin of the European Association for Japanese Studies, n. 15, December 1980.
 1984 "Silk Culture in Western India: the "Mutti Experiment" (1830-1847)", Indian Economic and Social History Review, 21, 4, 1984.
 1986 "Japan and the 'Pebrine' crisis of European sericulture during the 1860s", Bonner Zeitschrift für Japanologie, 8, 1986.
 1989 "Japan as a newcomer in the world silk market: the European assessment (1848-1898)", Rivista internazionale di scienze economiche e commerciali, XXXVI, n. 1, 1989.
 1990 "Rerouting the Silk Road via San Francisco. Italian Entrepreneurs and the Silk Crisis of the 1850s",in Storia Nordamericana, 7 (1990), I, pp. 105–116.
 1993 Alla ricerca del seme perduto. Sulla via della seta tra scienza e speculazione (1858-1862) [Italian silk traders in China and India, 1858-1862], Angeli, Milano 1993.
 1994 Where the roads met. East and West in the Silk Production Processes (17th to 19th Centuries), Kyoto 1994.
 1994 "Current historical research into the silk industry in Italy", in Textile History, 25 (1994), I, pp. 61–78.
 1996 "Tradition and Change in the Early Marketing of Japanese Silkworm Eggs: The First large-scale Japanese Inroad into Western Markets (1863-1875)", in S. Metzger-Court, W. Pascha (eds), Japan's Socio-Economic Evolution. Continuity and Change, Japan Library (Curzon Press), Folkestone (U.K.), 1996, pp. 50–65.
 1999 "The valorisation of silk heritage in Italy: building viable tourist itineraries around historical uniqueness", Actes du Colloque Patrimoine industriel etsociété locale: identités, valorisation, emploi, Le Creusot, 24 - 25 octobre 1996, Patrimoinede l’ industrie,      2, 1999, pp. 9–14.
 1999 "L’art de la soie, Pour la Science" - N° Special / Fibres Textiles, 266, Déc. 1999, pp. 44–49.
 2000 (with Molà, L., Mueller, R.C.), La seta in Italia dal Medioevo al Seicento - Dal baco al drappo, [Silk in Italy from Middle Ages to 17th Century] Fondazione Giorgio Cini. Marsilio. Venezia 2000. 
 2000 "I cicli di  produzione nellecarte da parati cinesi del Castello di Govone", in Il Castello di Govone - Gliappartamenti, [18th Century Chinese wall-papers with silk-cycle motives in a Piedmont, Italy, Castle] CELID, Torino 2000, pp. 60–75. 
 2001 "Italian silk traders in Japan at the time of pebrine silkworm epidemics (1861-1880)" in Sericultural Exchange between Italy and Japan in the Middle of 19th Century - Mazzocchi, Shimamura and ItalianSilk Costumes, Nippon Silk Center, Gunma 2001, pp. 41–50.
 2001 "Kinu bôeki to shoki no Nichi-I Kôryû, in Bakumatsu Ishin to Gaikô", Bakumatsu Ishin Ronshû 7, Yoshikawa Kôbunkan, Tokyô 2001, pp. 286–315. .
 2001  "Il tempo di Odorico e la Seta, in: La Cina e la Via della Seta nel viaggio di Odorico da Pordenone", [Silk in the Times of Odoric's travel to China], Comune di Pordenone, Pordenone 2001, pp. 62–88.
 2002 "The Worldwide Web of Silk Production, 1300-2000", Paper presented to the XIIIth International Conference of Economic History, Buenos Ayres, July 2002.
 2003 "Ėchanges, appropriation et diffusion detechnologies d’ origine étrangère au Japon: Le cas de la sériciculture et de l’ industrie de la soie (1860-1900)", Ebisu, Maison Franco-Japonaise, 31, Tokyo,December 2003, pp. 5-25. ISSN 1340-3656.
 2005 "Pre-Modern European Silk Technology and East Asia: Who Imported What?" in Ma Debin (ed.), Textiles in the Pacific, 1500-1900, Ashgate Variorum, Aldershot (UK), 2005, pp. 105–189. 
 2006 "Semai. Setaioli italiani in Giappone (1861-1880), [Italian Silk Entrepreneurs in Japan, 1861-1880] CLEUP, Padova 2006.
 2007 "La fabrication de la soie: un domaine réservé auxfemmes", Travail, genre et sociétés, 18, 2007, pp. 111–130.
 2008 Setaioli italiani in Asia. Imprenditori della seta in Asia Centrale dal 1859 al 1871 [Italian Silk Entrepreneurs in Central Asia, 1859-1871], CLEUP, Padova, 2008.
 2009 "Italian documents on Central Asia: The papers of Giulio Adamoli (1869-1870)",  Eurasian Studies, VII/1-2, 2009 (2010), pp. 87–123.
 2010 "Le donne e il ciclo della seta [Women and the silk production cycle], in Percorsi di lavoro e progetti di vita femminili (a cura di A. Martinelli e L. Savelli), Felici Editore, Pisa 2010, pp. 25-46.
 2010 "The Migration of the Silk Cycle from China: a Comprehensive View", Paper presented to the International Meeting on Historical Systems of Innovation – The Culture of Silk in the Early Modern World (14th to 18th Century). Max-Planck-Institut fuer Wissenschaftgeschichte, Berlin, 17.12.2010
 2012 “Senza la barriera delle Alpi. La seta e l’eredità intellettuale di Matthieu Bonafous Tra Lyon e Torino”. English Translation: “Overcoming the Barrier of the Alps. Silk and the Intellectual Legacy of Matthieu Bonafous between Lyons and  Turin”, CROMOHS, Cyber Review of Modern Historiography, 17, 2012, Firenze University Press.
 2013 "La Cina delle manifatture come modello esterno per le élite piemontesi del ‘700. Le carte da parati del castello di Govone", [Chinese Manufactures in Govone’s Castle Wallpapers. A model to 18th Century Piedmont Ruling Class], in Pazzagli, Rossano (acura di), Il mondo a metà. Studi storici sul territorio el’ambiente in onore di Giuliana Biagioli, ETS, Pisa 2013, pp. 329–336.

External links 
Claudio Zanier on the China National Silk Museum website
Claudio Zanier on Academia
Claudio Zanier on Worldcat

References

1942 births
Living people
20th-century Italian historians
Silk Road
21st-century Italian historians